al-Banna is an Arabic family name, it translates to “The Mason”:

 Ibn al-Banna, Arab mathematician and astronomer
 Hassan al Banna, founder of the Muslim Brotherhood
 Gamal al-Banna, liberal Islamic scholar, brother of Hassan al-Banna
 Abu Nidal, born Sabri Khalil al-Banna, Palestinian political leader, mercenary, and the founder of Fatah — the Revolutionary Council (Fatah al-Majles al-Thawry), more commonly known as the Abu Nidal Organization (ANO)
 Qasim Sultan al-Banna, director general of Dubai Municipality since 1992
 Jamil al-Banna, Jordanian with refugee status in the U.K., presently held in extrajudicial detention in the U.S. in the Guantanamo Bay detainment camps